Atavachron is the fourth studio album by guitarist Allan Holdsworth, released in 1986 through Enigma Records (United States) and JMS–Cream Records (Europe). It features Holdsworth's first recorded use of the SynthAxe, an instrument which would be featured prominently on his future albums. The album's title and seventh track, as well as the cover art, are references to the Atavachron alien time travel device from the Star Trek episode "All Our Yesterdays".

Critical reception

John W. Patterson of AllMusic awarded Atavachron four stars out of five, describing it as "semi-progressive" with a "symphonic element" and praising it as "clear evidence of the genius Holdsworth was demonstrating release after release". He also highlighted the use of the SynthAxe, as well as praising the "beautiful female vocals" of Rowanne Mark, who makes her first of two appearances on a Holdsworth album; the other being Secrets (1989).

Track listing

Personnel
Allan Holdsworth – guitar, SynthAxe, engineering, mixing, production
Rowanne Mark – vocals (track 7)
William Edward Childs – keyboard (tracks 2, 5)
Alan Pasqua – keyboard (tracks 3, 4, 6)
Gary Husband – drums (tracks 1, 2, 4, 6)
Chad Wackerman – drums (tracks 3, 7)
Tony Williams – drums (track 5)
Jimmy Johnson – bass

Technical
Robert Feist – engineering, mixing
Dan Humann – engineering, mixing
Bernie Grundman – mastering
Francois Bardol – cover art

References

External links
Atavachron at therealallanholdsworth.com (archived)

Allan Holdsworth albums
1986 albums
Enigma Records albums